Mohammad Fahad Muflih al-Qahtani (born 1965) is a human rights activist, economics professor and political prisoner currently jailed at Al-Ha’ir Prison in Riyadh co-founding and later leading the Saudi Arabia human rights organisation Saudi Civil and Political Rights Association prior to his arbitrary 2012 arrest. Alkarama described al-Qahtani as "one of [the Saudi Arabian judiciary's] most eloquent and fervent critics". On 9 March 2013, al-Qahtani was sentenced to ten years in prison followed by a ten-year travel ban, ostensibly for "co-founding an unlicensed civil association". He has carried out several hunger strikes to protest Saudi prison conditions endured during his politically motivated incarceration.  As of 2022, he remains jailed and has been intermittently kept in solitary confinement since 2018.

In 2018, he was awarded the Right Livelihood Award, together with other jailed activists Abdullah al-Hamid and Waleed Abulkhair for "their visionary and courageous efforts, guided by universal human rights principles, to reform the totalitarian political system in Saudi Arabia." Their  awards were received on their behalf by his son Omar al-Qahtani and Yahya Assiri.

Education and academic career
Mohammad Fahad al-Qahtani has a PhD from Indiana University in the United States. , he was employed as an economics professor at the Institute of Diplomatic Affairs of the Saudi Arabian Ministry of Foreign Affairs.

Human rights activities

2008 hunger strike
In November 2008, al-Qahtani was among 20 human rights activists who started a two-day hunger strike in protest against the imprisonment without fair, public trials of 11 activists, including Suliman al-Reshoudi and former university professors. Al-Qahtani stated that petitions calling for the activists to receive fair trials and better conditions of detention were ignored, and that freedom of speech and freedom of assembly were not respected in Saudi Arabia.

2009 Saudi Civil and Political Rights Association
Al-Qahtani co-founded the Saudi Arabian human rights organisation Saudi Civil and Political Rights Association (ACPRA) in October 2009 together with Mohammed Saleh al-Bejadi and nine others. , he continued to be active in ACPRA.

2011 prisoner demonstration 
On 5 Feb 2011, about 40 women demonstrated in front of the Interior Ministry in central Riyadh, calling for the release of prisoners. Mohammed al-Qahtani later told Reuters, "The women demand to free people imprisoned in the campaign against terrorism. Many people have been held up for a long time without trial, or have nothing to do with al Qaeda."  According to an ACPRA website, they were carrying signs that said, "free our prisoners or try them in a fair public court."

2012 court case

Charges and trial 
Al-Qahtani was charged in a Saudi court on 18 June 2012 on 11 charges related to his human rights activism, including:

If convicted, penalties for al-Qahtani could include a 5-year prison term, a travel ban and a fine. Another founding member of ACPRA, Mohammed al-Bejadi received a four-year jail sentence in April 2012.

One of the charges against al-Qahtani was "sending 'false information presented as facts to the official international mechanisms.'" The human rights organisation Alkarama interpreted this to refer to al-Qahtani's founding role in ACPRA and ACPRA's work with Alkarama in preparing documents to give to the United Nations Working Group on Arbitrary Detention.

Mohammad al-Qahtani's trial started on 1 September 2012 with nine charges, including "setting up an unlicensed organisation and breaking allegiance to the king". The trial of Abdullah al-Hamid, another ACPRA co-founder, started on the same day. Supporters of al-Qahtani and al-Hamid were initially present in the courtroom. Text and photo reports of the trial were published live on the social networking services Twitter and Facebook, which was described by the Sebastian Usher of the BBC as "a measure of transparency that is unusual in Saudi Arabia". The judge ordered some of the audience to leave the court room. According to Al Arabiya, those ordered to leave were mobile phone users, and according to the BBC, those ordered to leave were al-Qahtani's and al-Hamid's supporters and family.

On 9 March 2013, he was found guilty of several charges and sentenced to ten years in prison followed by ten years of travel ban.

International reaction 

On 29 June, the Cairo Institute for Human Rights Studies spoke on al-Qahtani's behalf at the 20th session of the United Nations Human Rights Council, stating its "uttermost concern over the targeting of activists for their cooperation with international human rights protection mechanisms" and referring specifically to the charges against al-Qahtani.

Amnesty International described the charges as "part of a series of recent trials aimed at silencing human rights activists" in Saudi Arabia. Later, it described the sentence as an evidence of "Saudi Arabian authorities’ inability to deal with any opinion that contradicts their own." Human Rights Watch described the sentence as being "outrageous."

Imprisonment 
Al-Qahtani was shifted into solitary confinement on 17 December 2018. He carried out several hunger strikes in 2020 and 2021 in protest against prison conditions.

On 26 May 2022, al-Qahtani was assaulted by a mentally ill prisoner. Other prisoners defended al-Qahtani and stopped the assault.

Points of view

Low-end jobs for Saudi women 
In 2009, Al-Qatani opposed the opening of housemaid jobs to Saudi women, saying that low-end jobs should be performed by migrant workers. The statement was made in response to a report that 30 Saudi women recruited through an employment agency had taken on jobs as domestic workers. Al-Qahtani criticized the ministry of labor for forcing Saudis into low-end jobs, saying they should instead start from the top, since high-end jobs were readily available, and there were plenty of expatriates to fill the menial jobs.

Women to Drive movement 
On 17 June 2011, Al-Qatani tweeted, "My wife, Maha, and I have just come from a 45-minute drive, she was the driver through Riyadh streets," a reference to the Women2Drive movement, a campaign for Saudi women's right to drive that called for Saudi women to start driving starting 17 June 2011.

Human rights
Al-Qahtani believes that all people, including those suspected of terrorist activities, have the right to a fair trial.

Arab Spring
In April 2011, al-Qahtani stated in relation to the Saudi-led Peninsula Shield Force intervention in the Bahraini uprising:

In early 2011, al-Qahtani believed that "the only serious way to seek change is by slow and concentrated steps". He suggested that the families of political prisoners would be more motivated to carry out street protests, especially if women participated, compared to "liberals". During the Arab Spring events of early 2011, al-Qahtani received telephone calls from political prisoners' families, prior to a 5 February 2011 protest in front of the Ministry of Interior in Riyadh by 50 women. Al-Qahtani stated that "the small group spent the night in jail, but they got serious news coverage in the process."

In June 2012, after being charged in court for his human rights activities, al-Qahtani stated:

See also 

 Saudi Civil and Political Rights Association (ACPRA)

References

External links 

 
 A scanned copy of the official charges in the Trial of al-Hamid and al-Qahtani.

1960s births
Year of birth missing (living people)
Living people
Human rights abuses in Saudi Arabia
Saudi Arabian human rights activists
Saudi Arabian academics
Indiana University alumni
Amnesty International prisoners of conscience held by Saudi Arabia
Saudi Arabian prisoners and detainees
People of the 2011–2012 Saudi Arabian protests